Mekong Airlines was an airline based in Cambodia.

History
Founded in 2002, Mekong Airlines operated scheduled flights to several destinations in southeast Asia using a leased Boeing 737-500, which was put in service 15 January 2003 and returned on 16 October of that year, marking the end of the airline's business. The airline was made up of mostly Australian management thanks to an agreement between Australian and Cambodian investors.

Destinations

Mekong Airlines served the following destinations prior to its collapse:

Fleet
Mekong Airlines operated a single Boeing 737-500 aircraft throughout operations:

References

Defunct airlines of Cambodia
Airlines established in 2002
Airlines disestablished in 2003
2003 disestablishments in Cambodia
Cambodian companies established in 2002